The Pacific Southwest Railway Museum Association (PSRMA) is a museum in San Diego, California of the railroad history of the pacific southwest region.  Founded in 1961, the PSRMA has been providing visitors with the opportunity to experience the rich railroad history of California through interactive exhibits, and vintage train rides. It was originally named San Diego County Railway Museum and, from 1988 to 2000, as San Diego Railroad Museum.

References

Museums in San Diego County, California